The Quanzhou Maritime Museum in the Fengze District of Quanzhou, Fujian, is the only museum in China specialising in overseas relations. Established in 1959, through its comprehensive and valuable display of historical relics relating to overseas transportation, the museum reflects the development history of the major Eastern port of the Middle Ages—Citong or Zaytun.  It also showcases the important role that Quanzhou played in economic and cultural exchanges with foreign countries.

Introduction 
The museum consists of an old and a new section. The old section, housed in a purpose-built exhibition hall on the grounds of the Kaiyuan Temple,  is used for exhibiting ancient boats. The new section, completed in 1991 and located near the scenic East Lake Park, resembles a large sailing ship afloat on the sea. There are four exhibition halls in the new section named “Quanzhou Maritime Exhibition Hall”, “Quanzhou Religious Stone Carving Hall”, “Quanzhou Ethnic Culture Exhibition Hall” and “Ancient Chinese Model Hall”.

Rare collections 

Among the exhibits of particular interest are:
 The Quanzhou ship: A Song Dynasty (9601279) ship unearthed in 1974.
 Stone stelae and tombstones with religious inscriptions. Besides Buddhist ones, there are Islamic, Christian, and Hindu specimens.
 Export ceramics: the Dehua porcelain is of particular value.
 Ancient navigation equipment: such as a four-claw anchor dating to the Ming Dynasty (13681644)

References

See also 

 List of museums in China

Buildings and structures in Quanzhou
Tourist attractions in Quanzhou
Museums in Fujian
Transport museums in China
History museums in China
1959 establishments in China
National first-grade museums of China